The Landesliga Bayern-Südwest is currently the sixth tier of the German football league system in south western Bavaria and the third tier of the Bavarian football league system.  

It is one of five Landesligas in Bavaria, the other four being the Landesliga Südost, Landesliga Mitte, Landesliga Nordost and Landesliga Nordwest. The league champion automatically qualifies for the Bayernliga, the runners-up needs to compete with the runners-up of the other four Landesligas and a number of Bayernliga teams for another promotion spot. 

The league replaced the Landesliga Bayern-Süd at this level, with the former having existed from 1963 to 2012. However, while the Landesliga Süd covered all of Bavarian Swabia and Upper Bavaria the new league only covers Bavarian Swabia and western Upper Bavaria.

History

Formation

The Bavarian Football Association carried out drastic changes to the league system at the end of the 2011–12 season. With the already decided introduction of the Regionalliga Bayern from 2012–13, it also placed two Bayernligas below the new league as the new fifth tier of the German league system, splitting the previously single division league into a northern and a southern group. Below those, five Landesligas instead of the existing three were set, which were geographically divided to limit travel and increase the number of local derbies.

Clubs from three different league tiers were able to qualify for the new league. From the Landesliga level, specifically the Landesliga Bayern-Süd, the clubs placed ninth to 15th had the opportunity to qualify for the Bayernliga through play-offs. Those clubs who failed to qualify for the Bayernliga were grouped in the Landesliga. The Landesliga clubs placed 16th, 17th and 18th automatically went to the Landesliga. The Bezirksoberliga (BOL) champions also had the chance to qualify for the Bayernliga. Those clubs who failed went to the Landesliga, alongside the BOL teams placed second to sixth. The teams placed seventh to tenth in Swabia and seventh to twelfth in Upper Bavaria entered a play-off with the Bezirksliga champions for the remaining Landesliga spots. The regulations also allowed for Bavarian clubs playing outside the Bavarian league system to join the Landesliga should they fulfil the qualifying norms. As FV Illertissen, playing in the Oberliga Baden-Württemberg, opted to join the new Regionalliga Bayern its reserve side, finishing fourth in the Landesliga Württemberg 2, was allowed to enter the Landesliga Südwest.

The league started out with 18 clubs in its inaugural season, the clubs coming from the following leagues:
 From the Landesliga Bayern-Süd (VI): TSV Landsberg, FC Pipinsried, FC Gundelfingen, VfB Durach, TSG Thannhausen
 From the Bezirksoberliga Schwaben (VII): SV Mering, TSV 1861 Nördlingen, TSV Mindelheim, SpVgg Kaufbeuren, TSV Ottobeuren, TSV Bobingen, FC Memmingen II, FC Königsbrunn
 From the Bezirksoberliga Oberbayern (VII): FC Gerolfing, SV Manching, SV Raisting
 From the Landesliga Württemberg 2 (VII): FV Illertissen II
 From the Bezirksliga Oberbayern-Nord (VIII): TSV 1865 Dachau

Seasons
The opening game of the new league took place on 20 July 2012 when TSV Mindelheim hosted TSV Ottobeuren and won 4-1. At the end of the 2012–13 season, league champions FC Pipinsried were directly promoted while runners-up SV Raisting earned promotion via the promotion round. At the other end of the table, TSV Mindelheim, SV Manching and FC Königsbrunn were directly relegated, while FC Memmingen II and TSV Bobingen had to enter the promotion/relegation round with the Bezirksliga runners-up. Bobingen was relegated after losing to SV Türkgücü-Ataspor München while Memmingen maintained its league place after overcoming TSV Wertingen. For the 2013–14 season the league received four of the five teams relegated from the Bayernliga Süd in 2013, TSV Aindling, TSV Gersthofen, SC Fürstenfeldbruck and TSV Kottern. Additionally, four clubs were promoted to the league, SC Bubesheim, TSV Friedberg, SC Oberweikertshofen and Sportfreunde Dinkelsbühl, with the later becoming the first Middle Franconian team to enter the league. Apart from the four relegated sides the league also lost TSV Dachau and FC Gerolfing who moved to the Südost division after the 2012–13 season.

The 2019–20 season was interrupted by the coronavirus disease pandemic in Germany that began in March 2020. It was later suspended until 31 August, forcing a cancellation of the 2020–21 season as the BFV approved a resumption of the preceding one, which was curtailed in May 2021.

Modus
The league is played in a home-and-away format with the league champion being directly promoted to the Bayernliga. The runners-up enters a promotion round with the other four Landesliga runners-up and the Bayernliga teams placed just above the direct relegation ranks, 15th and 16th in the south and 15th in the north, for additional spots in this league. For 2016–17, the bottom (i.e., 17th) team from the Landesliga is directly relegated to the Bezirksligas. The teams placed 15th to 16th have to play-off with the Bezirksliga runners-up for their place in the Landesliga.

Top-three of the Landesliga 
The following teams have finished in the top-three in the league:

 Promoted teams in bold.
 The 2019–20 season was suspended and later extended to 2021, when it was curtailed and the top were determined on a points per game basis.

League placings
The complete list of clubs and placings in the league since inception in 2012:

Placings for 2020 were based on the table at the point of suspension during the coronavirus pandemic. Final placings were after the curtailment of the resumed 2019–20 season in 2021.

Key

References

External links 
 Bayerischer Fußball-Verband (Bavarian FA) 
 Das deutsche Fußball-Archiv Historic German league tables 
 The Landesliga Bayern-Südwest on fupa.net 

  

Sudwest
2012 establishments in Germany
Sports leagues established in 2012